Puerto Rican recording artist Ricky Martin has released ten studio albums, seven compilation albums, two live albums, one soundtrack album and four box sets. Martin has sold over 70 million records, making him one of the best-selling Latin music artists of all time. His self-titled debut studio album was released in November 1991 by Sony Discos. Two years later, Columbia Records released Martin's second studio album, Me Amaras. Despite both albums failing to achieve a significant commercial success, they pushed Martin towards superstar status in many Latin American countries. His third studio album, A Medio Vivir, was released in September 1995 by Sony Latin. The album features a "harder rock edge style" than his previous efforts, while being mixed with Latin references such as flamenco and cumbia. A Medio Vivir charted in several countries and peaked at number seven in Spain and number 11 on the US Latin Albums chart.

In 1998, Martin released his fourth studio album, Vuelve, which became his first record to chart on the US Billboard 200 chart, peaking at number 40; it became the highest-selling Latin album of 1999 and is the tenth bestselling Latin album of all-time in the country . Additionally, it peaked at number one on the US Latin Albums chart and in Spain, where it was certified six-times platinum by Promusicae. He released his fifth studio and second eponymous album in 1999; it was a commercial success reaching number one in Australia, Finland, Spain and in the United States, and number two in the United Kingdom. It was certified seven-times platinum by the Recording Industry Association of America (RIAA), denoting shipments of over seven million copies in the United States. As of April 2011, Ricky Martin has sold over 15 million copies worldwide, making it his best selling-album.

Martin released his sixth studio album, Sound Loaded, in 2000. The album peaked in the top five in Australia, Spain, Sweden, Switzerland and the United States, where it was certified double platinum for shipments of over two million units. In 2001, Martin released two greatest hit albums: La Historia and The Best of Ricky Martin. La Historia compiled his biggest Spanish-language hits and charted at number 83 on the US Billboard 200 and number one on the US Latin Albums chart, while The Best of Ricky Martin which consisted of his biggest English-language hits, peaked at number 23 in Australia and 17 in Finland. In 2003, the singer released his seventh studio album, Almas del Silencio. It peaked at number one on the US Latin Albums chart and number 12 on the US Billboard 200.

Martin's eight studio album, Life, was released in October 2005 to moderate success, peaking at number six in the United States and number 40 in the United Kingdom. In 2006, Martin's first live album, MTV Unplugged, was released by Sony Music Norte. It peaked at number 38 on the US Billboard 200 and number one on the US Latin Albums chart. Martin's ninth studio album, Música + Alma + Sexo was released by Sony Music Latin in January 2011. It peaked at number three in the United States and received a platinum certification in the Latin field by the RIAA, indicating shipments of over 100,000 copies in the country. In April 2013, he released his sixth compilation album, Greatest Hits: Souvenir Edition, exclusively in Australia, where it peaked at number two and was certified gold by the Australian Recording Industry Association (ARIA). A Quien Quiera Escuchar, Martin's tenth studio album, was released in February 2015; it debuted at number 20 on the US Billboard 200 chart and number one on the US Top Latin Albums chart.

Studio albums

Live albums

Compilation albums

Soundtracks

Extended plays

Box sets

See also
Ricky Martin singles discography

Notes

References 

Pop music discographies
Latin pop music discographies
Discographies of Puerto Rican artists